No. 151 Helicopter Unit (Sarangs) is a Helicopter Unit and is equipped with HAL Dhruv and based at Sulur Air Force Station.

Sarang (Peacock in Sanskrit) is the helicopter display team of the Indian Air Force.

History
The unit was inducted as No.151 Helicopter Unit in 2005.

Assignments

Aircraft
HAL Dhruv

References

151